Gaius (or Caius) Fabius Pictor made some of the earliest Roman paintings that have survived.  At least some of his works were painted in 304 BC. No tradition of Roman painting exists earlier than the time of Fabius, nor does his example appear to have been followed by any of his contemporaries; for an interval of nearly a hundred and fifty years occurs before any mention is made of another Roman painter.

Fabius, called Pictor, a Roman artist, descended from the celebrated family of the Fabii, painted principally at Rome. Pictor was the grandfather of the Roman historian Quintus Fabius Pictor. In 304 BC, Pictor decorated the Temple of Salus on the Quirinal Hill, with a representation (presumably) of the battle gained by Bubulcus over the Samnites. His paintings were preserved until the reign of the Emperor Gaius, when the temple was destroyed by fire. They were probably held in little estimation, as Pliny, to whom they must have been known, neither acquaints us with the subjects, nor commends the execution.

The art of painting in its rude and early forms was general in Italy, but was founded on the Etruscan style, which never advanced beyond a flat polychromatic treatment.  In painting Romans never acquired the individuality in which it did in the other arts. Painting was then little respected by the Romans, and that the title of Pictor was not considered as an honourable distinction, but rather intended to stigmatize the illustrious character who had degraded his dignity by the practice of an art which was held in no consideration, may be inferred from a passage of Cicero, in the first book of his Tusculan Disputations: "An censemus si Fabio nobilissimo homini laudatum esset quod pingeret, non multos etiam apud nos Polycletos et Parrhasios fuisse." (That is: "Do we imagine that if it had been considered commendable in Fabius, a man of the highest rank, to paint, we should not have had many Polycleti and Parrhasii.")

Notes

Sources
World Book Encyclopedia. Vol. F, p. 2.

Attribution:
 

Year of birth unknown
Year of death unknown
Ancient Roman painters
4th-century BC Romans
Pictor, Gaius
4th-century BC painters